Hanna Batatu (1926 in Jerusalem – 24 June 2000 in Winsted, Connecticut, U.S.) was a Palestinian Marxist historian specialising in the history of Iraq and the modern Arab east. His work on Iraq is widely considered the preeminent study of modern Iraqi history.

Born in Jerusalem in 1926 to a Palestinian Arab Christian family, Hanna Batatu emigrated to the United States in 1948, the year of the Nakba - a series of events surrounding the establishment of the state of Israel in most of (what had previously been) British Mandate Palestine, as well as the creation of a large Palestinian refugee population barred by the new state from returning to their homes. From 1951 to 1953, he studied at Georgetown University's Edmund A. Walsh School of Foreign Service. He gained his doctorate at political science in Harvard University in 1960, with a dissertation entitled  The Shaykh and the Peasant in Iraq, 1917-1958. From 1962 to 1982 he taught at the American University of Beirut, then from 1982 until his retirement in 1994 at Georgetown University in the United States.

Batatu started studying Iraqi history in the 1950s, taking a particular interest in the revolutionary movements which were then prominent in that country and especially in the Iraqi Communist Party. From the late 1950s on he travelled to Iraq several times, and succeeded in having access to communist political prisoners and secret police files before the revolution of 1958. He was allowed access to security service archives from various periods of Iraqi history, up until the 1970s, and used this and his considerable range of personal contacts with figures from different political movements to compose his study of political change in Iraq, The Old Social Classes and New Revolutionary Movements of Iraq (published in 1978). This work, although largely focusing on the Iraqi Communist Party, also provides a wealth of information about the other revolutionary movements in the country as well as the ruling classes prior to 1958, and is considered  one of the fundamental works on modern Iraqi history. Batatu's methodology is grounded in political sociology and considers in detail the social factors for the developments he covers, and even more so the social composition of the movements in question.

Batatu also undertook a similar study of Syria, Syria's Peasantry, the Descendants of Its Lesser Rural Notables, and Their Politics (published in 1999).

References

Further reading
  The Egyptian, Syrian, And Iraqi Revolutions Some Observations On Their Underlying Causes And Social Character, Hanna Batatu, 1983  
 The old social classes and the revolutionary movements of Iraq: A study of Iraq's old landed and commercial classes and of its communists, Ba'thists, and free officers, Hanna Batatu, London, al-Saqi Books, 2012.  (first edition 1978)
 Syria's Peasantry, the Descendants of Its Lesser Rural Notables, and Their Politics, Hanna Batatu,  Princeton University Press, 2012.

External links

1926 births
2000 deaths
People from Jerusalem
Academic staff of the American University of Beirut
American writers of Palestinian descent
Palestinian socialists
Walsh School of Foreign Service alumni
Georgetown University faculty
Harvard Graduate School of Arts and Sciences alumni
Historians of the Middle East
Historians of Iraq
Historians of Syria
Palestinian Marxist historians
20th-century Palestinian historians
Palestinian Marxists
Mandatory Palestine emigrants to the United States
American Marxist historians
20th-century American historians